St Wilfrid's Catholic High School is a mixed secondary school and sixth form with academy status located in Featherstone, West Yorkshire, England. It has Vocational specialisms.

The school has previously been a language college, but has stopped providing these courses at A2 levels.

History and overview
St Wilfrid's was opened up as a school in 1963. In 1998, St Wilfrid's became a Language College which offers six languages including French, Spanish, German, Russian, Italian and Japanese. This is no longer provided in a bid to make cuts.

The most recent OfSTED and Section 48 Religious Education inspection which identified the school as "a very good school, with many excellent features". St. Wilfrid's was awarded a second specialism as a Vocational specialist college which came into effect in September 2006. Courses on offer to pupils include: Health & Social care, Travel and Tourism, Performing Arts (Dance, Singing and Drama), IT for Practitioners, NVQ in European languages, NVQ Hairdressing, CISCO IT networking and Construction.

The school has launched a theatrical production every year for approximately 20 years; the plays and musicals always draw in audiences of local families and the parents of pupils. The most recent of these productions was Sister Act in February 2018.
In 2006, the school has undergone renovations, In expanding its grounds to include the new 'Newlands' building and two new tennis courts. Newlands has been used for maths, music, technology and language lessons for all year groups.

The school became an academy in November 2012. The school had its 50th birthday celebration in October 2013.

The school has had various leadership, uniform and management issues in the past.

The school's most recent and biggest upgrade was the 3G pitch, built in 2020 and opened to students for the 2020/21 academic year

Awards
The school has achieved several national awards including the Schools Curriculum Award, Sportsmark Award, the School Achievement Award given in 2002 and 2003 for outstanding improvements in GCSE results. The Arts Council Artsmark Silver award, the British Council International School Award for outstanding global links, the Ramseys Award given to the school with the best global video-conferencing facilities and programme, as well as the Investors in People Award recognizing excellence in training and development for all teaching and non-teaching staff have also been earned. In February 2007 the school was awarded the Arts Council Artsmark Gold award.

Vocational 
In 2006 the school was awarded a second specialism as a Vocational College. Vocational specialism means that the school offers a distinctive range of courses that provide opportunities for pupils to gain qualifications. All vocational courses follow a curriculum developed by exam boards with the help of employers. Wherever possible, links to the world of employment are emphasized; this may be visiting speakers, work placements, visits or real work. This means that in most cases pupils will be occupationally competent to carry out a job in their chosen career.

A-Level and BTEC available courses

 Biology (A Level)
 Business (A Level)
 Chemistry (A Level)
 English Language (A Level)
 English Literature (A Level)
 Extended Project (A Level)
 Fine Art (A Level)
 Geography (A Level)
 History (A Level)
 Mathematics (A Level)
 Further Mathematics (A Level)
 Media (A Level)
 Photography (A Level) 
 Physical Education (A Level) 
 Physics (A Level)
 Psychology (A Level) 
 Religious Studies (A Level) 
 Sociology (A Level)
 Health and Social Care (BTEC Extended Diploma)
 Applied Sciences (BTEC Extended Certificate and Diploma)

Language curriculum
The ethos of a language college is widespread throughout school. The curriculum includes 3 Languages; French, German and Spanish, 2 of which are taught at key stage 3 as first and second languages. In key stage 4 the department offers 3 Languages at GCSE level. 
NVQ level 1 language units qualification was introduced into the teaching of the department in September 2005. This has proven to be a success in both raising standards and motivating pupils to relate the learning of a language to a useful, practical and tangible work related environment. NVQ Level 2 qualifications were introduced in September 2006 and the school aims to extend its provision and training in NVQ in future years as it develops its vocational status.
At A2 level, French, German, Spanish and Italian are no longer taught.

References

External links
Official website

Secondary schools in the City of Wakefield
Catholic secondary schools in the Diocese of Leeds
Educational institutions established in 1963
1963 establishments in England
Academies in the City of Wakefield
Featherstone